Gideon Freudmann, is a composer, performer and cello innovator coined the term CelloBop to describe his music. His solo performances often include improvisation and the use of technology to sample, loop and layer tracks in real time to create music that is complex, nuanced, creative and compelling.

Composer and cellist Gideon Freudmann enjoys an international reputation for his innovative compositions and unique approach. He has been on the forefront of that instrument's modern creative expansion and his music is immediately accessible and richly detailed in its nuance and complexity. His compositions are heard on television soundtracks and as a contributor to NPR's All Things Considered, This American Life and he was a TEDtalk speaker . The Boston Globe said of him, “Taking a modern artist's approach to the four-stringed instrument, Gideon Freudmann has brought the cello to a new realm.”

His music has appeared in several episodes of Weeds, and has been placed in a number of indie films including the Sundance Documentary Film winner, Buck.

Freudmann has released numerous solos CDs as well as several duet albums with guitar, mandolin, violin, shakuhachi, and ukulele. He has published several sheet music ensembles for cello trios, quartets and quintets. He is a founding member and composer  for The Portland Cello Project and Caravan Gogh. The short film, Denmark, based on his composition of the same name has won numerous international awards.

Freudmann performs live soundtracks for classic silent films with a focus on Buster Keaton comedies and German Expressionist films such as The Cabinet of Dr Caligari and Phantom of the Opera. He also performs and composes music for dance companies including the internationally acclaimed Project Bandaloop. He has composed music for several short films and the feature-length movie, Clocking The T.  Gideon Freudmann tours throughout the United States and has performed in Europe, Australia and Asia. Originally from New England, he now resides in the Pacific Northwest.

Discography
Fellini's Martini (1993)
Cellobotomy (1995)
Banking Left (1995)
Adobe Dog House (1997)
Sound of Distant Deer (1998)
Hologram Crackers (1999)
More Batteries (2001)
Ukrainian Pajama Party (2001)
Holiday Clocks (2001)
Dancing On My Hat (2002)
CelloTales (2004)
Ghost in the Attic (2005)
The Cabinet of Dr Caligari (2006)
Caravan Gogh (2007)
The Cabinet of Doctor Caligari DVD (2008)
Sonic Surf (2008)
7 in the Afternoon (2011)
Cello Shots (2011)
Rain Monsters (2012)
The 3 Faces of Steve (2014)
Magnetic West (2015)
Spring Breakup (2017)
Unraveling (2017)
Sasquatch (2020)
Flying Cars (2022)

Filmography
An American Farmer (2020)
Clocking The T (2018)
La Escuela Del Crimen (2018)
Agnes Martin Before The Grid (2018)
Poison (2015)
Tashi’s Turbine (2015)
Weeds (TV - 12 Episodes) (2007-2012)
Denmark (2011)
Buck (2011)
The Unfortunate Gift (2011)
Of the Air of the Earth (2008)

Silent Film Soundtracks:

Nosferatu
The General
The Cabinet of Doctor Caligari
Sherlock Jr
Metropolis
Phantom Of The Opera
Pandora’s Box
Downhill (Hitchcock)
Steamboat Bill, Jr
College
Woman in the Moon

Radio Programming:

This American Life
All Thing Considered
Car Talk

Sheet Music (cello ensembles)

Denmark (cello quintet)
Robin Hood Changes His Oil (cello quintet)
Indigo Blue (cello quintet)
Fiddler on a Hot Tin Roof (cello quintet)
Vertigogh (cello quartet)
Equinox (cello quintet)
Dance of the Seahorse (cello quartet)
Manila Waltz (cello quartet)
Midnight Moon (cello quintet)
Princess Mortuba (cello quartet)
Blue Stew (cello solo)
Wind and Snow (cello quintet)
Lilia's 3-Step (cello quartet)
Nine (cello quartet)
Ice cave (cello quartet)
Home (cello quartet)
Blue Cello (cello trio)
CelloBop Book 1 (cello solo, duo, trio)

See also
Cello rock
Mortal City
Denmark (film)

References

FAME Review: Gideon Freudmann - Hologram Crackers
cdBaby.com review – Gideon Freudmann – Ukrainian Pajama Party

External links
Artist's website
TEDx Talk
The Portland Cello Project

American cellists
Living people
Year of birth missing (living people)